This is a list of the Australian moth species of the family Epipyropidae. It also acts as an index to the species articles and forms part of the full List of moths of Australia.

Agamopsyche threnodes Perkins, 1905
Heteropsyche micromorpha Perkins, 1905
Heteropsyche poecilochroma Perkins, 1905
Heteropsyche stenomorpha Perkins, 1905
Palaeopsyche melanias Perkins, 1905

External links 
Epermeniidae at Australian Faunal Directory

Australia
Epipyropidae